Kaputjugh is the highest mountain in the Zangezur range, forming the border between the Nakhchivan Autonomous Republic of Azerbaijan and the Syunik Province of Armenia.

References

External links 
 
 
 

Mountains of Armenia
International mountains of Asia